Jordaniella is a genus of very small sea snails, minute marine gastropod mollusks or micromollusks in the subfamily Odostomiinae of the Pyramidellidae.

Species
 Jordaniella nivosa (Montagu, 1803)
 Jordaniella truncatula (Jeffreys, 1850)

References

 Chaster G. W. 1898 [october]. A report upon the mollusca (excluding the Cephalopoda and Nudibranchiata) obtained by the Royal Irish Academy Cruises of 1885, 1886 and 1888. Proceedings of the Royal Irish Academy (3) 5: 1-33

Pyramidellidae